Plamen Ivanov Grozdanov (born 24 September 1950) was the Ambassador Extraordinary and Plenipotentiary of the Republic of Bulgaria to the Russian Federation from October, 2006 to April, 2012.

He graduated in University of National and World Economy in Sofia.

See also 
 Embassy of Bulgaria in Moscow

References 

Diplomats from Sofia
Living people
Ambassadors of Bulgaria to Russia
1950 births
University of National and World Economy alumni